The following outline is provided as an overview of and topical guide to Indonesia:

Indonesia – sovereign island nation located in Southeast Asia comprising more than 17,000 islands of the Maritime Southeast Asia.

General reference 

 Pronunciation: 
 Common English country name: Indonesia
 Official English country name: The Republic of Indonesia
 Common endonym(s): Indonesia
 Official endonym(s): Republik Indonesia
 Adjectival(s): Indonesian 
 Etymology: Names of Indonesia
 International rankings of Indonesia
 Largest archipelagic state
 Fourth most populous country
 Fifteenth largest country
 ISO country codes:  ID, IDN, 360
 ISO region codes:  See ISO 3166-2:ID
 Internet country code top-level domain:  .id
 Phone code: +62

Geography of Indonesia 

Geography of Indonesia
 Indonesia is: an equatorial megadiverse island country
 Location:
 Eastern Hemisphere, on the Equator
 Eurasia (though not on the mainland)
 Asia
 Southeast Asia
 Maritime Southeast Asia
 Between:
 Indian Ocean
 Pacific Ocean
 Time zones:
 East Indonesian Time (UTC+09)
 Central Indonesian Time (UTC+08)
 West Indonesian Time (UTC+07)
 Extreme points of Indonesia
 High:  Puncak Jaya on New Guinea  – highest point on any ocean island
 Low:  Indian Ocean 0 m
 Land boundaries

 Territorial waters of Indonesia
 Population of Indonesia
 Area of Indonesia
 Atlas of Indonesia

Geology of Indonesia 
 Summary
 Geology of Indonesia book (under preparation)

Environment of Indonesia 

Environment of Indonesia
 Climate of Indonesia
 Environmental issues in Indonesia
 Deforestation in Indonesia
 Ecoregions in Indonesia
 Geology of Indonesia
 Earthquakes in Indonesia
 Biosphere reserves in Indonesia
 National parks of Indonesia
 Volcanology of Indonesia
 Wildlife of Indonesia
 Flora of Indonesia
 Fauna of Indonesia
 Birds of Indonesia
 Endemic birds of Indonesia
 Mammals of Indonesia

Natural geographic features of Indonesia 
 Beaches in Indonesia
 Glaciers of Indonesia
 Islands of Indonesia
 Lakes of Indonesia
 Rivers of Indonesia
 Volcanoes in Indonesia
 List of World Heritage Sites in Indonesia

Regions of Indonesia 

Regions of Indonesia

Ecoregions of Indonesia 

List of ecoregions in Indonesia

Islands of Indonesia 

Islands of Indonesia
Main islands: 
Sumatra - the sixth largest island in the world, largest island entirely in Indonesia
Kalimantan - the third largest island in the world
Papua - the second largest island in the world
Java - the most densely populated island in the world
Sulawesi

Administrative divisions of Indonesia 

Administrative divisions of Indonesia per July 2022:
 37 provinces of Indonesia (including six special autonomous provinces)
 98 cities of Indonesia (including five special administrative cities)
 Districts of Indonesia
 415 regencies of Indonesia (including one special administrative regency)
 Districts of Indonesia

Provinces of Indonesia 

The provinces of Indonesia and their capitals, arranged by island or island group, are:
(Indonesian name in brackets where different from English)
† indicates provinces with Special Status

Sumatra
Aceh† - Banda Aceh
North Sumatra (Sumatera Utara) - Medan
West Sumatra (Sumatera Barat) - Padang
Riau - Pekanbaru
Riau Islands (Kepulauan Riau) - Tanjung Pinang
Jambi - Jambi (city)
South Sumatra (Sumatera Selatan) - Palembang
Bangka Belitung Islands (Kepulauan Bangka Belitung) - Pangkal Pinang
Bengkulu - Bengkulu (city)
Lampung - Bandar Lampung
Java
Jakarta† - Jakarta
Banten - Serang
West Java (Jawa Barat) - Bandung
Central Java (Jawa Tengah) - Semarang
Special Region of Yogyakarta† (Daerah Istimewa Yogyakarta) - Yogyakarta (city)
East Java (Jawa Timur) - Surabaya
Lesser Sunda Islands
Bali - Denpasar
West Nusa Tenggara (Nusa Tenggara Barat) - Mataram
East Nusa Tenggara (Nusa Tenggara Timur) - Kupang
Kalimantan
West Kalimantan (Kalimantan Barat) - Pontianak
Central Kalimantan (Kalimantan Tengah) - Palangka Raya
South Kalimantan (Kalimantan Selatan) - Banjarmasin
East Kalimantan (Kalimantan Timur) - Samarinda
North Kalimantan (Kalimantan Utara) - Tanjung Selor
Sulawesi
North Sulawesi (Sulawesi Utara) - Manado
Gorontalo - Gorontalo (city)
Central Sulawesi (Sulawesi Tengah) - Palu
West Sulawesi (Sulawesi Barat) - Mamuju
South Sulawesi (Sulawesi Selatan) - Makassar
Southeast Sulawesi (Sulawesi Tenggara) - Kendari
Maluku Islands
Maluku - Ambon
North Maluku (Maluku Utara) - Sofifi
Papua
West Papua† (Papua Barat) - Manokwari
Central Papua† (Papua Tengah) - Nabire
South Papua† (Papua Selatan) - Merauke
Highland Papua† (Papua Selatan) - Wamena
Papua† - Jayapura

Cities of Indonesia 

Cities of Indonesia
 Capital of Indonesia: Jakarta

Regencies of Indonesia

Demography of Indonesia 

Demographics of Indonesia
 Ethnic groups in Indonesia
 Urbanization in Indonesia
 Women in Indonesia

Government and politics of Indonesia 

Politics of Indonesia
 Form of government: presidential multi-party representative democratic republic
 Capital of Indonesia: Jakarta
 Corruption in Indonesia
 Elections in Indonesia
 Indonesian presidential elections
 2004
 2009
 2014 
 Indonesian parliamentary elections
 1955 (Sep)
 1955 (Dec)
 1971
 1977
 1982
 1987
 1992
 1997
 1999
 2004
 2009
 2014
 Indonesian general elections
2019
 Political parties in Indonesia
 Taxation in Indonesia
 Terrorism in Indonesia

Branches of the government of Indonesia 

Government of Indonesia

Executive branch of the government of Indonesia 
 Head of state: President of Indonesia, Joko Widodo
 Head of government: President of Indonesia, Joko Widodo
 Vice President of Indonesia, Ma'ruf Amin
 Cabinet of Indonesia

Legislative branch of the government of Indonesia 

 People's Consultative Assembly (bicameral legislature)
 Upper house: Regional Representative Council (lesser chamber)
 Lower house: People's Representative Council

Judicial branch of the government of Indonesia 

Court system of Indonesia
 Supreme Court of Indonesia
 Constitutional Court of Indonesia
 Judicial Commission of Indonesia

Foreign relations of Indonesia 

Foreign relations of Indonesia
 Diplomatic missions in Indonesia
 Diplomatic missions of Indonesia
 Indonesian ambassadors
 Embassy of Indonesia in Moscow
 Embassy of Indonesia, London
 Embassy of Indonesia, Ottawa
 Embassy of Indonesia, Washington, D.C.
 Embassy of Indonesia, Windhoek
 Consulate General of Indonesia, Houston
 Consulate General of Indonesia, Vancouver
 CIA activities in Indonesia
 Foreign aid to Indonesia

International organization membership 

International organization membership of Indonesia

The Republic of Indonesia is a member of:

African Union/United Nations Hybrid operation in Darfur (UNAMID)
Asian Development Bank (ADB)
Asia-Pacific Economic Cooperation (APEC)
Asia-Pacific Telecommunity (APT)
Association of Southeast Asian Nations (ASEAN)
Association of Southeast Asian Nations Regional Forum (ARF)
Bank for International Settlements (BIS)
Colombo Plan (CP)
East Asia Summit (EAS)
Food and Agriculture Organization (FAO)
Group of 15 (G15)
Group of 20 (G20)
Group of 77 (G77)
International Atomic Energy Agency (IAEA)
International Bank for Reconstruction and Development (IBRD)
International Chamber of Commerce (ICC)
International Civil Aviation Organization (ICAO)
International Criminal Police Organization (Interpol)
International Development Association (IDA)
International Federation of Red Cross and Red Crescent Societies (IFRCS)
International Finance Corporation (IFC)
International Fund for Agricultural Development (IFAD)
International Hydrographic Organization (IHO)
International Labour Organization (ILO)
International Maritime Organization (IMO)
International Mobile Satellite Organization (IMSO)
International Monetary Fund (IMF)
International Olympic Committee (IOC)
International Organization for Migration (IOM) (observer)
International Organization for Standardization (ISO)

International Paralympic Committee (IPC) 
International Red Cross and Red Crescent Movement (ICRM)
International Telecommunication Union (ITU)
International Telecommunications Satellite Organization (ITSO)
International Trade Union Confederation (ITUC)
Inter-Parliamentary Union (IPU)
Islamic Development Bank (IDB)
Multilateral Investment Guarantee Agency (MIGA)
Nonaligned Movement (NAM)
Organisation of Islamic Cooperation (OIC)
Organisation for the Prohibition of Chemical Weapons (OPCW)
United Nations (UN)
United Nations Conference on Trade and Development (UNCTAD)
United Nations Educational, Scientific, and Cultural Organization (UNESCO)
United Nations Industrial Development Organization (UNIDO)
United Nations Interim Force in Lebanon (UNIFIL)
United Nations Mission in Liberia (UNMIL)
United Nations Mission in the Sudan (UNMIS)
 United Nations Mission of Observers in Tajikistan (UNMOT) 
United Nations Observer Mission in Georgia (UNOMIG)
United Nations Organization Mission in the Democratic Republic of the Congo (MONUC)
Universal Postal Union (UPU)
World Confederation of Labour (WCL)
World Customs Organization (WCO)
World Federation of Trade Unions (WFTU)
World Health Organization (WHO)
World Intellectual Property Organization (WIPO)
World Meteorological Organization (WMO)
World Tourism Organization (UNWTO)
World Trade Organization (WTO)

Law and order in Indonesia 

Law of Indonesia
 Atheism in Indonesian law
 Blasphemy law in Indonesia
 Cannabis in Indonesia
 Constitution of Indonesia
 Copyright law of Indonesia
 Crime in Indonesia
 Corruption in Indonesia
 Human trafficking in Indonesia
 Piracy in Indonesia
 Massacres in Indonesia
 Human rights in Indonesia
 LGBT rights in Indonesia
 Freedom of religion in Indonesia
 Polygamy in Indonesia
 Prostitution in Indonesia
 Law enforcement in Indonesia
 Patent office in Indonesia
 Penal system in Indonesia
 Indonesian prisoners and detainees
 Capital punishment in Indonesia
 Speed limits in Indonesia

Military of Indonesia 

Military of Indonesia
 Command
 Commander-in-chief: President of Indonesia, Joko Widodo
 Commander of the Indonesian National Armed Forces, Andika Perkasa
 Minister of Defence of Indonesia, Prabowo Subianto
 Forces
 Army of Indonesia
 Navy of Indonesia
 Air Force of Indonesia
 Special forces of Indonesia
 Military history of Indonesia
 Military ranks of Indonesia

History of Indonesia 
History of Indonesia
 Timeline of Indonesian history

By field 
 Military history of Indonesia

By period 

 Prehistory

Early kingdoms

 Srivijaya (3rd to 14th centuries)
 Tarumanagara (358-723)
 Sailendra (8th & 9th centuries)
 Kingdom of Sunda (669-1579)
 Kingdom of Mataram (752–1045)
 Pagaruyung Kingdom
 Kediri (1045–1221)
 Singhasari (1222–1292)
 Majapahit (1293–1500)

The rise of Muslim states

 The spread of Islam (13th century to 16th century)
 Ternate Sultanate (1257–1914)
 Malacca Sultanate (1400–1511)
 Cirebon Sultanate (1445–1677)
 Sultanate of Demak (1475–1518)
 Aceh Sultanate (1496–1903)
 Pagaruyung Kingdom (1500-1825)
 Johor-Riau Sultanate (1511-1911)
 The Sultanate of Banten (1526–1813)
 Mataram Sultanate (16th century to 18th century)

European colonialism

 Portuguese colonialism in Indonesia (1512–1850)
 Dutch East India Company (1602–1800)
 Dutch East Indies (1800–1942)

The emergence of Indonesia

 National Awakening (1899–1942)
 Japanese Occupation (1942–1945)
 Declaration of Independence (1945)
 National Revolution (1945–1950)
 Emergency Government of the Republic of Indonesia

Independent Indonesia

 Liberal Democracy (1950–1957)
 Guided Democracy (1957–1965)
 Start of the New Order (1965–1966)
 The New Order (1966–1998)
 Reformation Era (1998–present)

Culture of Indonesia 

Culture of Indonesia
 Architecture of Indonesia
 Architecture of Sumatra
 Balinese architecture
 Colonial architecture of Indonesia
 Cuisine of Indonesia
 Cultural properties of Indonesia
 Customs of Indonesia
 Etiquette in Indonesia
 Freemasonry in Indonesia
 Languages of Indonesia
 Indonesian language
 Endangered languages in Indonesia
 Media in Indonesia
 Magazines published in Indonesia
 Newspapers in Indonesia
 Mythology of Indonesia
 National symbols of Indonesia
 Coat of arms of Indonesia
 Flag of Indonesia
 National anthem of Indonesia: Indonesia Raya
 People of Indonesia
 Names in Indonesia
 National Heroes of Indonesia
 Ethnic groups in Indonesia
 Philosophy of Indonesia
 UFO sightings in Indonesia
 Traditions of Indonesia
 Folklore of Indonesia
 Public holidays in Indonesia
 List of World Heritage Sites in Indonesia

Art in Indonesia 

 Indonesian art
 Cinema of Indonesia
 Indonesian films
 Dance in Indonesia
 Literature of Indonesia
 Folklore of Indonesia
 Music of Indonesia
 Indonesian musicians and musical groups
 Indonesian pop musicians
 Museums and cultural institutions in Indonesia
 National Museum of Indonesia
 Theatre of Indonesia
 Television in Indonesia

Religion in Indonesia 

Religion in Indonesia
 Buddhism in Indonesia
 Christianity in Indonesia
 Bible translations into the languages of Indonesia and Malaysia
 Protestantism in Indonesia
 Roman Catholicism in Indonesia
 Church buildings in Indonesia
 Cathedrals in Indonesia
 Confucianism in Indonesia
 Hinduism in Indonesia
 Hindu temples in Indonesia
 Islam in Indonesia
 Spread of Islam in Indonesia
 Ahmadiyya in Indonesia
 Mosques in Indonesia
 Judaism in Indonesia
 Sikhism in Indonesia

Sports in Indonesia 

Sports in Indonesia
 Badminton Association of Indonesia
 Football in Indonesia
 Football Association of Indonesia
 Football clubs in Indonesia
 Football records in Indonesia
 Women's football in Indonesia
 Futsal records in Indonesia
 Netball in Indonesia
 Rugby union in Indonesia

Economy and infrastructure of Indonesia

Economy of Indonesia
 Economic rank
 Economic issues in Indonesia
 Poverty in Indonesia
 Agriculture in Indonesia
 Aquaculture in Indonesia
 Coconut production in Indonesia
 Coffee production in Indonesia
 Rice production in Indonesia
 Banks in Indonesia
 Bank Indonesia – the central bank of Indonesia
 Communications in Indonesia
 Internet in Indonesia
 Telephone numbers in Indonesia
 Television in Indonesia
 Postage stamps and postal history of Indonesia
 Postal codes in Indonesia
 Companies of Indonesia
Currency of Indonesia: Rupiah
ISO 4217: IDR
 Energy in Indonesia
 Nuclear power in Indonesia
 Renewable energy in Indonesia
 Geothermal power in Indonesia
 Health care in Indonesia
 Indonesia Stock Exchange
 Main infrastructure projects in Indonesia
 Mines in Indonesia
 Taxation in Indonesia
 Tourism in Indonesia
 List of shopping malls in Indonesia
 Transport in Indonesia
 Aviation in Indonesia
 Airlines of Indonesia
 Airports in Indonesia
 Ports in Indonesia
 Rail transport in Indonesia
 Train stations in Indonesia
 Road transport in Indonesia
 Driving licence in Indonesia
 Speed limits in Indonesia
 Toll roads in Indonesia
 Vehicle registration plates of Indonesia
 Water supply and sanitation in Indonesia

Education in Indonesia 

Education in Indonesia
 Academic grading in Indonesia
 National Library of Indonesia
 Science and technology in Indonesia
 Medical schools in Indonesia
 Universities in Indonesia

Health in Indonesia 

Health in Indonesia
 Health hazards
 HIV/AIDS in Indonesia
 Smoking in Indonesia

See also

Indonesia
Index of Indonesia-related articles
List of Indonesia-related topics
List of international rankings
Member state of the Group of Twenty Finance Ministers and Central Bank Governors
Member state of the United Nations
Outline of Asia
Outline of geography
Outline of Oceania
Outline of Jakarta

 Accusations of ExxonMobil human rights violations in Indonesia
 Afflictions: Culture & Mental Illness in Indonesia
 Agricultural Involution: The Processes of Ecological Change in Indonesia
 Communist Party of Indonesia
 Communist Party of Indonesia (Red)
 Confederation of Indonesia Prosperous Trade Union
 Constitutional Assembly of Indonesia
 Government Investment Unit of Indonesia
 International rankings of Indonesia
 Islamic University of Indonesia
 Kraft Foods Combat Malnutrition in Indonesia
 Labour Party of Indonesia
 Largest cities in Indonesia
 City nicknames in Indonesia
 English words of Indonesian origin
 Female Cabinet Ministers of Indonesia
 First Ladies and Gentlemen of Indonesia
 Indonesia-related topics
 Indonesia Super League hat-tricks
 Indonesian-language poets
 Indonesian acronyms and abbreviations
 Indonesian agricultural universities and colleges
 Indonesian ambassadors
 Indonesian Ambassadors to Australia
 Indonesian Ambassadors to Egypt
 Indonesian Ambassadors to the United Kingdom
 Indonesian Americans
 Indonesian animal emblems
 Indonesian composers
 Indonesian dishes
 Indonesian endemic animals
 Indonesian endemic butterflies
 Indonesian endemic freshwater fishes
 Indonesian endemic plants
 Indonesian floral emblems
 Indonesian football champions
 Indonesian football competitions all-time top scorers
 Indonesian Indos
 Indonesian infantry battalions
 Indonesian monarchies
 Indonesian painters
 Indonesian provinces by GRP per capita
 Indonesian provinces by HDI
 Indonesian records in swimming
 Indonesian submissions for the Academy Award for Best Foreign Language Film
 Indonesians
 Indonesians by net worth
 Loan words in Indonesian
 Metropolitan areas in Indonesia
 Ministers of Finance of Indonesia
 Ministers of Law and Human Rights of Indonesia
 National Parks of Indonesia
 Power Stations in Indonesia
 Presidents of Indonesia
 Prime Ministers of Indonesia
 Regencies and Cities of Indonesia
 Roman Catholic Dioceses in Indonesia
 Schools in Indonesia
 Stadiums in Indonesia
 Tallest Buildings in Indonesia
 Tallest Structures in Indonesia
 Television Stations in Indonesia
 Terrorist Incidents in Indonesia
 Twin Towns and Sister Cities in Indonesia
 Vice Presidents of Indonesia
 May 1998 riots of Indonesia
 Military Ordinariate of Indonesia
 Muria Christian Church in Indonesia
 National Archives of Indonesia
 National costume of Indonesia
 National Emblem of Indonesia
 National Paralympic Committee of Indonesia
 National Sports Committee of Indonesia
 National symbols of Indonesia
 Orders, decorations, and medals of Indonesia
 Peasants Front of Indonesia
 Pentecostal Church in Indonesia
 Permanent Representative of Indonesia to the United Nations
 Proclamation of Indonesian Independence
 Protected areas of Indonesia
 Public holidays in Indonesia
 Regions of Indonesia
 Republic of the United States of Indonesia Cabinet
 Revolutionary Government of the Republic of Indonesia
 Shi'a Islam in Indonesia
 Socialist Party of Indonesia
 Socialist Party of Indonesia (Parsi)
 Society of Actuaries of Indonesia
 Specialty Coffee Association of Indonesia
 The National Volleyball Federation of Indonesia
 Time in Indonesia
 Times of Indonesia
 Union of Catholic University Students of the Republic of Indonesia
 United States of Indonesia
 University of Indonesia
 Vice President of Indonesia
 Visa policy of Indonesia
 Voice of Indonesia
 Volcanological Survey of Indonesia

References

External links

 Geography

 

 Government
 Government of Indonesia
 Minister of The State Secretary (Indonesian)
 Antara - National News Agency
 Statistics Center

 
 
Indonesia